Madinatul Uloom Al Islamiya (MTU) is an Islamic boarding college in the county of Worcestershire near Kidderminster, England. It was one of the first Islamic seminaries for boys after Darul Uloom Bury, both of which were founded by the late scholar Yusuf Motala. The site was originally founded as a girls boarding college in 1987 (currently Jaamiatul Imaam Muhammad Zakaria based in Bradford) and then refounded as a boys college in 1992.

Madinatul Uloom teaches students aged between 11 and 28.

In 2015 the school began the construction of a new hall, which will be utilised for lectures, exams and recreational activities. This hall will also accommodate guests who come to attend the joint annual graduation ceremony for graduates from Madinatul Uloom and Darul Uloom Bury.

Syllabus 
The madrasah specialises in offering two main routes of educational pathways in conjunction with the UK school syllabus which are the Hifz programme and the Alimiyyah programme (based on the dars nizami syllabus).

The Alimiyyah programme is an intensive six-year course which specialises in an in-depth study of many subjects such as Islamic Tafsir, Hadith, Fiqh, Jurisprudence, Philosophy, History, Theology, Classical Arabic and Quran.

Notable lecturers and alumni 

 Shaykh Abu Yusuf Riyadh ul Haq
 Shaykh Zahir Mahmood
 Yusuf Ibrahim Lorgat
 Mufti Niaz Hannan
 Shaykh Azad Ali (Currently a Teacher of Tafseer and Hadith)

References

Islamic schools in the United Kingdom
Islamic seminaries and theological colleges
Educational institutions established in 1992
Boarding schools in Worcestershire
1992 establishments in England